Baranovo is the name of several rural localities in Russia.

Modern localities

Ivanovo Oblast
As of 2012, two rural localities in Ivanovo Oblast bear this name:
Baranovo, Puchezhsky District, Ivanovo Oblast, a village in Puchezhsky District
Baranovo, Verkhnelandekhovsky District, Ivanovo Oblast, a selo in Verkhnelandekhovsky District

Kirov Oblast
As of 2012, one rural locality in Kirov Oblast bears this name:
Baranovo, Kirov Oblast, a village in Nikolsky Rural Okrug of Yaransky District;

Kostroma Oblast
As of 2012, four rural localities in Kostroma Oblast bear this name:
Baranovo, Buysky District, Kostroma Oblast, a village in Baranovskoye Settlement of Buysky District; 
Baranovo, Nerekhtsky District, Kostroma Oblast, a village in Volzhskoye Settlement of Nerekhtsky District; 
Baranovo, Sharyinsky District, Kostroma Oblast, a village in Ivanovskoye Settlement of Sharyinsky District; 
Baranovo, Susaninsky District, Kostroma Oblast, a village in Sokirinskoye Settlement of Susaninsky District;

Kursk Oblast
As of 2012, one rural locality in Kursk Oblast bears this name:
Baranovo, Kursk Oblast, a selo in Kunyevsky Selsoviet of Gorshechensky District

Leningrad Oblast
As of 2012, one rural locality in Leningrad Oblast bears this name:
Baranovo, Leningrad Oblast, a village in Serebryanskoye Settlement Municipal Formation of Luzhsky District;

Lipetsk Oblast
As of 2012, one rural locality in Lipetsk Oblast bears this name:
Baranovo, Lipetsk Oblast, a village in Afanasyevsky Selsoviet of Izmalkovsky District;

Moscow
As of 2012, one rural locality in Moscow bears this name:
Baranovo, Moscow, a village in Pervomayskoye Settlement of Troitsky Administrative Okrug in the federal city of Moscow

Moscow Oblast
As of 2012, four rural localities in Moscow Oblast bear this name:
Baranovo, Borisovskoye Rural Settlement, Mozhaysky District, Moscow Oblast, a village in Borisovskoye Rural Settlement of Mozhaysky District
Baranovo, Yurlovskoye Rural Settlement, Mozhaysky District, Moscow Oblast, a village in Yurlovskoye Rural Settlement of Mozhaysky District
Baranovo, Uvarovka, Mozhaysky District, Moscow Oblast, a village under the administrative jurisdiction of Uvarovka Work Settlement in Mozhaysky District
Baranovo, Ruzsky District, Moscow Oblast, a village in Dorokhovskoye Rural Settlement of Ruzsky District

Nizhny Novgorod Oblast
As of 2012, two rural localities in Nizhny Novgorod Oblast bear this name:
Baranovo, Sosnovsky District, Nizhny Novgorod Oblast, a selo in Yakovsky Selsoviet of Sosnovsky District
Baranovo, Voskresensky District, Nizhny Novgorod Oblast, a village in Vladimirsky Selsoviet of Voskresensky District

Novgorod Oblast
As of 2012, three rural localities in Novgorod Oblast bear this name:
Baranovo, Shimsky District, Novgorod Oblast, a village in Podgoshchskoye Settlement of Shimsky District
Baranovo, Soletsky District, Novgorod Oblast, a village in Dubrovskoye Settlement of Soletsky District
Baranovo, Starorussky District, Novgorod Oblast, a village in Velikoselskoye Settlement of Starorussky District

Oryol Oblast
As of 2012, two rural localities in Oryol Oblast bear this name:
Baranovo, Livensky District, Oryol Oblast, a selo in Vakhnovsky Selsoviet of Livensky District
Baranovo, Mtsensky District, Oryol Oblast, a village in Vysokinsky Selsoviet of Mtsensky District

Perm Krai
As of 2012, three rural localities in Perm Krai bear this name:
Baranovo, Chernushinsky District, Perm Krai, a village in Chernushinsky District
Baranovo, Kosinsky District, Perm Krai, a village in Kosinsky District
Baranovo, Solikamsky District, Perm Krai, a settlement in Solikamsky District

Pskov Oblast
As of 2012, seven rural localities in Pskov Oblast bear this name:
Baranovo, Krasnogorodsky District, Pskov Oblast, a village in Krasnogorodsky District
Baranovo, Kunyinsky District, Pskov Oblast, a village in Kunyinsky District
Baranovo, Nevelsky District, Pskov Oblast, a village in Nevelsky District
Baranovo, Palkinsky District, Pskov Oblast, a village in Palkinsky District
Baranovo, Porkhovsky District, Pskov Oblast, a village in Porkhovsky District
Baranovo, Pskovsky District, Pskov Oblast, a village in Pskovsky District
Baranovo, Pushkinogorsky District, Pskov Oblast, a village in Pushkinogorsky District

Ryazan Oblast
As of 2012, one rural locality in Ryazan Oblast bears this name:
Baranovo, Ryazan Oblast, a village in Davydovsky Rural Okrug of Klepikovsky District

Smolensk Oblast
As of 2012, four rural localities in Smolensk Oblast bear this name:
Baranovo, Dukhovshchinsky District, Smolensk Oblast, a village in Tretyakovskoye Rural Settlement of Dukhovshchinsky District
Baranovo, Roslavlsky District, Smolensk Oblast, a village in Gryazenyatskoye Rural Settlement of Roslavlsky District
Baranovo, Safonovsky District, Smolensk Oblast, a village in Baranovskoye Rural Settlement of Safonovsky District
Baranovo, Vyazemsky District, Smolensk Oblast, a village in Khmelitskoye Rural Settlement of Vyazemsky District

Tomsk Oblast
As of 2012, one rural locality in Tomsk Oblast bears this name:
Baranovo, Tomsk Oblast, a village in Krivosheinsky District

Tula Oblast
As of 2012, one rural locality in Tula Oblast bears this name:
Baranovo, Tula Oblast, a village in Fedyashevskaya Rural Territory of Yasnogorsky District

Tver Oblast
As of 2012, four rural localities in Tver Oblast bear this name:
Baranovo, Kashinsky District, Tver Oblast, a village in Karabuzinskoye Rural Settlement of Kashinsky District
Baranovo, Ostashkovsky District, Tver Oblast, a village in Botovskoye Rural Settlement of Ostashkovsky District
Baranovo, Torzhoksky District, Tver Oblast, a village in Bolshesvyattsovskoye Rural Settlement of Torzhoksky District
Baranovo, Vesyegonsky District, Tver Oblast, a village in Ivanovskoye Rural Settlement of Vesyegonsky District

Vladimir Oblast
As of 2012, two rural localities in Vladimir Oblast bear this name:
Baranovo, Gus-Khrustalny District, Vladimir Oblast, a village in Gus-Khrustalny District
Baranovo, Kovrovsky District, Vladimir Oblast, a village in Kovrovsky District

Vologda Oblast
As of 2012, five rural localities in Vologda Oblast bear this name:
Baranovo, Chagodoshchensky District, Vologda Oblast, a settlement in Borisovsky Selsoviet of Chagodoshchensky District
Baranovo, Cherepovetsky District, Vologda Oblast, a village in Ilyinsky Selsoviet of Cherepovetsky District
Baranovo, Kichmengsko-Gorodetsky District, Vologda Oblast, a village in Kichmengsky Selsoviet of Kichmengsko-Gorodetsky District
Baranovo, Velikoustyugsky District, Vologda Oblast, a village in Teplogorsky Selsoviet of Velikoustyugsky District
Baranovo, Vytegorsky District, Vologda Oblast, a village in Ankhimovsky Selsoviet of Vytegorsky District

Yaroslavl Oblast
As of 2012, four rural localities in Yaroslavl Oblast bear this name:
Baranovo, Bolsheselsky District, Yaroslavl Oblast, a village in Blagoveshchensky Rural Okrug of Bolsheselsky District
Baranovo, Nekrasovsky District, Yaroslavl Oblast, a village in Burmakinsky Rural Okrug of Nekrasovsky District
Baranovo, Poshekhonsky District, Yaroslavl Oblast, a village in Pogorelsky Rural Okrug of Poshekhonsky District
Baranovo, Rybinsky District, Yaroslavl Oblast, a village in Pogorelsky Rural Okrug of Rybinsky District

Abolished localities
Baranovo, Parfenyevsky District, Kostroma Oblast, a village in Zadorinsky Selsoviet of Parfenyevsky District in Kostroma Oblast; abolished on October 18, 2004

Alternative names
Baranovo, alternative name of Baranovka, a selo in Shcheglovskaya Rural Territory of Kemerovsky District in Kemerovo Oblast;

References

Notes

Sources